Edmund Anscombe (8 February 1874 – 9 October 1948) was one of the most important figures to shape the architectural and urban fabric of New Zealand. He was important, not only because of the prolific nature of his practice and the quality of his work, but also because of the range and the scale of his built and speculative projects. These extended from conventional essays to monumental urban schemes informed by his international travel, especially in America. His influence was specifically felt in Dunedin, Wellington and Hastings, yet he also realised projects in Alexandra, Invercargill, Palmerston, Palmerston North, Rotorua, Waimate North and Wanaka. His key works include the 1925–26 New Zealand and South Seas International Exhibition, the 1940 New Zealand Centennial Exhibition, the Herd Street Post and Telegraph building, Anscombe Flats, the Empire Deluxe theatre and his work on the clocktower complex – including specifically the Archway Building and Marama Hall – effectively re-conceiving the design of the University of Otago's historical core.(University of Otago Clocktower complex). His sister is painter Eliza Anscombe

Biographical background 
Anscombe was born on 8 February 1874 in Lindfield, Sussex, England. His parents Edmund and Eliza Anscombe (née Mason) emigrated on 27 June 1874 to New Zealand on the Christian McAusland in the assisted immigration scheme. They arrived in Dunedin with seven-month-old Edmund and his two-year-old sister Eliza. His father is described as a carpenter aged 25 years old from Sussex. His mother was 28. They arrived in Otago, New Zealand on 30 September 1874. His sister Edith Violet was born in Dunedin on 1 April 1885.

Edmund attended Caversham School (from 1879–1885) and in 1888, as a 14-year-old boy, he left New Zealand on what, in most accounts, is seen to be a prophetic visit to the 1888 Melbourne exhibition. In his own words:

"From then onwards anything pertaining to Exhibitions held for me its own decided and never ending interest." (Anscombe Inside Story)

This lifelong interest in the design of exhibition buildings was furthered by: his attendance at the 1889–90 New Zealand and South Seas Exhibition in Dunedin, involvement in the Louisiana Purchase Exposition, St Louis (1904), his appointment as architect to the New Zealand and South Seas International Exhibition Company (1924–25), attendance at the Chicago World's Fair (1933) and the New York World's Fair (1939), and his appointment as the architect of the New Zealand Centennial Exhibition (1940). Whether the exhibition was the primary reason for his visit to Melbourne cannot be known for certain, but on his return Anscombe became an apprentice carpenter in Waiwera South, Otago, and worked for his father as a builder. This experience perhaps influenced his later architectural work which he approached with an entrepreneurial pragmatism. He married Douglas Watt on 24 May 1898 in Kaihiku near Balclutha, after which they lived with Edmund's parents. Their first child, Ruby, was born 1899. In 1911 their second daughter, Marjory, was born. Their first daughter would marry a fellow architect in 1935; George F. Penlington was the grandson of William Penlington.

In 1901 Anscombe travelled to America. This 1901–1906 trip is the most written about of his travels. He visited St Louis Purchase Exposition where he "received ... practical training in exhibitions in 1904" and it is during this time that he is said to have studied architecture, an idea first asserted in an obituary but something Anscombe himself does not refer to.

Architectural practice in Dunedin 

On their return to Dunedin, the Anscombes enrolled Ruby at High St School (24 July 1907). Described as "an architect now resident in Dunedin, who has had considerable experience in the United States," Anscombe won the University of Otago School of Mines competition in 1907 under the pseudonym: "Esperanto." This winning entry began his productive relationship with the university council which in 1911 conferred on him the position of university architect – a position he retained until 1928 when he left Dunedin for Wellington. This position gave him access to commissions across the university including: extensions to Maxwell Bury's work, Allen Hall (1914), the Domestic Science building (1918), the Physics building (1922), Marama Hall (1923), the Dental school (1924), and the Medical school (1927). Anscombe's early and consistent success in competitions (which included: the School of Mines (1907), Hanover Street Baptist Church, Dunedin (1912), Y.M.C.A. (1910), Central Hall (1910), and Otago Girls' High School (1910 and 1921 ) – where he won first and second place ) coincided with a number of ecclesiastical commissions: St. Clair Presbyterian Church (1909), Oamaru Presbyterian Church (1910), Musselburgh Presbyterian Church (c1910), Mornington Baptist Church (1910/11), North East Valley Presbyterian Church additions (c. 1913), Opoho Presbyterian Church (1913), and residential design work for: Mr Turnbull, for a residence on The Crescent, Roseneath (c.1936), Mr. Ivory (c.1909), Thomas Fogg (c.1910), Rev. James Chisholm (c1910), H. C. Campbell (1911), H. S. Bingham (1913), Thomas Thomson (c.1914).

These early years in Anscombe's practice were also early years in the history of the New Zealand Institute of Architects (N.Z.I.A), which began as a national organisation in 1905. Anscombe was elected a Fellow of the N.Z.I.A. in 1912. He also contributed an article entitled: "The Economic Value of Scientific Town Planning" to an N.Z.I.A. conference. About 1916, Anscombe began experimenting with a concrete block dry wall system. It was at this time he designed "Cintra," his house in Andersons Bay, Dunedin, which was constructed in these "O.K. blocks" which he patented in 1920. Shortly after this Anscombe's mother died at the age of 66 years on 2 July 1921.

Anscombe's practice continued to flourish and commissions from this time included the Maheno and Marama Hospital Ships' Surplus Fund Memorial Hall (1919/1923), the Lindo Ferguson Building (1927), the University of Otago Dental School (1924), Arthur Barnett's Department Store (1924), now part of the Meridian Mall, Dunedin, Messers Herbert, Haynes and Co Ltd building (1925), Logan Park Grandstand (1929) and, of course, the design work for the New Zealand and South Seas International Exhibition (1925–26), including the still surviving art exhibition building (1924), which involved a number of overseas trips specifically to Melbourne to consult with the engineer of the scenic railways in Melbourne.

Anscombe was utterly proactive in finding work and both the New Zealand and South Seas International Exhibition (1925) and the New Zealand Centennial Exhibition (1940) were initiated by him but it seems this proactive approach may have alienated him from some sectors of the architectural profession. The first signs of this appear at the time an architect was to be appointed for the 1925 exhibition and is documented in an exchange of letters between Anscombe and the N.Z.I.A. regarding this subject. The N.Z.I.A. had offered to donate

"a Lay-out Scheme on any Site ... [and] act in an Honorary Advisory capacity in approving and if necessary suggesting improvements to any design."

Later they advocated that the design work be apportioned to individual architects. Anscombe queried the N.Z.I.A. offer of a "donated" plan which, it seems, fast became conditional on the assurance of further work and he described this as "decidedly infra dig and a breach of etiquette on the part of ... the Institute much to be regretted." He made clear his opposition to the dividing of architectural responsibility, arguing that in his opinion it was not in the best interests of the Directors. In a later N.Z.I.A. meeting he was accused of "competing against the Institute for the work" and was asked to "retire from the Meeting." A similar situation occurred later with reference to the 1940 exhibition when Anscombe found himself opposed by the collective group of local architects. In that instance, it was Anscombe's ability to produce work quickly which ensured he got the commission.

Travels 1928–1929 
In 1928, after leaving Dunedin, Anscombe embarked on a longer world trip accompanied by his two daughters now aged 29 and 17 years. They left for this trip in early March 1928 and travelled to the Middle East (Egypt, Greece, Palestine, and Turkey), Britain (England, and Ireland), and Europe (Austria, Belgium, Czechoslovakia, France, Germany, Italy, Switzerland) concluding the journey in America before returning to New Zealand via Honolulu and Suva. The Dominion reports the group's recent return in April 1929. On this trip, Anscombe seemed particularly interested in architecture, city and street planning, and the use of lighting at night time. While they were abroad Anscombe's father died on 8 August 1928 at Ashburton at the Tuarangi Home for old men.

The trip bridges Anscombe's practice in Dunedin and his practice in Wellington. There are various speculations as to why Anscombe, a well established architect in his mid-fifties, made the move to Wellington at this time. Shaw attributes Anscombe's move to the need "to be ready to design the Centennial of New Zealand Exhibition of 1939–40," while McNeill notes the timing of Anscombe's departure coincides with the publication of The Inside Story which "would have made it difficult for him to remain in Dunedin."

Architectural practice in Wellington 

In Wellington Anscombe set up a practice on The Terrace and he and his daughters lived on Oriental Parade at the back of the section Anscombe was later to build Lyndfield (now Anscombe Flats). They lived there until the apartment block was completed in the late thirties. These apartments, like many projects during the inter-war depression, were built on the "No. 13" scheme where a percentage of the project's cost was met by Government funding. The Anscombes occupied the penthouse flat at Lyndfield, which, when his daughters married and left home, became a place of regular extended family gatherings. The flat was also where Anscombe trialled drafts of his schemes, letters, and proposals in front of his architect sons-in-law, daughters and grandchildren for discussion and feedback.

Anscombe employed a small office in Wellington which designed a range of work including residential apartments (Lyndfield and Olympus on Oriental Parade, Franconia on The Terrace (1938), Belvedere at the corner Austin and Majoribanks Streets), Hamilton Flats (Hawker Street) and commercial and institutional projects including: the Post and Telegraph Building, Herd St (1939), Dominion Motors, the Island Bay kindergarten, and the Lloyd St, Disabled Soldiers' Vocational Centre (1943). His work in the Hawke's Bay area included offices and a wool store for the New Zealand Shipping Co. Ltd at Port Ahuriri, Washpool Homestead, the Farmers Co-operative Association Building, Westerman & Co (1932), and the State Theatre (1933–34) with Vernon Brown in Hastings. One of his longest serving staff in this Wellington office was Mrs. Ethel Bulté, who was known as "Auntie Pat" by Anscombe's grandchildren. She was Anscombe's secretary and is remembered by the grandchildren as always wearing black, her "grey hair pulled back into a bun" with the appearance of being an "efficient secretary." She remained a friend of the family even after Anscombe died.

Once established in Wellington, and after the extension of his office into the Hawke's Bay following the 1931 earthquake, Anscombe travelled to the United States again visiting the Chicago World's Fair for three weeks in July 1933. Such schemes were sometimes extensions of building projects as in the case of the Post and Telegraph Building in Herd St which shaped a proposed gardens in Chaffers Park part of a plan, which was realised, to extend Cable St as "a new approach to Oriental Bay." Anscombe also contributed to the discussion of the shaping of the Civic Centre, publishing a scheme in The Dominion in June 1934.

In early May 1940, Anscombe anticipated travel to America and wrote to the Minister of Supply, Dan Sullivan, that he was

"anxious to visit the United States shortly – primarily to visit both the San Francisco and New York Worlds Fairs – but while there I intend to check up on the latest development in Combined Factories, Housing, City Planning Schemes generally, Air Port Schemes, Bus Termini Stations etc." (unpublished letter to D.G. Sullivan, Minister of Supply, May 1940)

He offered to report on these to the Minister on his return. Sullivan replied asking Anscombe to "particularly look at the latest developments in that country with a view to translating them into a concrete proposal for this country." On this trip Anscombe visited: the Douglas aircraft works, Santa Monica, the Curtis Wright Corporation, St Louis, the Lockheed factory, the Consolidated Aircraft Corporation, San Diego, and the Packard Company. He furnished a report to Sullivan dated 16 January 1941 in which he outlined the American context which supported the building of combined factories and referred Sullivan to his 1919 brochure: Modern Industrial Development. Two years later he published such a scheme for Aotea wharf in Wellington.

Town planning 
The 1925 and 1940 exhibitions also provided Anscombe with opportunities to suggest urban redevelopment schemes which would impact on each host city long after the period of the exhibition. In an article from June 1924, Anscombe outlined a proposal for a highway reserve, a park system, city zoning and housing, influenced by "the park and parkway system of Kansas City" and in keeping with Anscombe's "municipal housekeeping on scientific lines" outlined in his 1915 paper: "The Economic Value of Scientific Town Planning." The proposal was not implemented exactly as Anscombe suggested yet much of his intention has persisted, including the tree-lined Anzac Avenue and Logan Park, in Dunedin. This desire to ensure that temporary projects also served longer-term strategies is also seen in the anticipation that, like the San Francisco Treasure Island Fair, the 1940 New Zealand Centennial Exhibition buildings should be reconverted for use as airport buildings and that exhibition art galleries should be permanent. He also proposed an urban scheme for Wellington with a similar interest in long-term "betterments." Here he argued for an exhibition site close to central Wellington, in preference to Rongotai, maintaining that the central location was important and provided an opportunity "to carry out a much-needed improvement work" in the Adelaide road area. This central location was to take advantage of such already existing facilities as Government House, the Public Hospital, Wellington Boys' College, and the Museum and Art Gallery.

Architectural writing 
In addition to his architectural work Anscombe was an avid writer. During his lifetime he published a number of books and pamphlets and regularly published articles in local newspapers (both in Dunedin and in Wellington) writing on subjects ranging from urban planning and new building materials to the recollections of his travels. Anscombe's next travel overseas was an extensive tour of Canada and the United States where he visited "over fifty Canadian and American cities" in 1922. On this trip he learnt about building methods and town planning and continued his "keen interest in the construction of museums and art galleries ... making a special study of these buildings." The year following his return, his wife Douglas died aged 49, on 11 September 1923.

Final years 
Anscombe died on 9 October 1948, working up until his death. His funeral was held two days later at St John's Presbyterian church, Willis St on 11 October 1948. He was cremated at Karori and is buried in Andersons Bay Cemetery in Dunedin. His will was filed on 20 October, his estate valued at £20,757 17 shillings and 8 pence. In addition to relatives, St John's Presbyterian Church and the Crippled Children Society Wellington Branch were beneficiaries. An obituary in October 1948 in the Dominion, noted of the funeral that:

"The New Zealand Institute of Architects was represented and nearly every member of the Wellington branch attended. Most of the leading building firms of the city were also generously represented."

References 

 Anscombe, Edmund The inside story of the New Zealand & South Seas International Exhibition Dunedin, 1925–1926 (London: E. Anscombe, Farmer & Sons, 1928)
 
 Croot, Charles Dunedin Churches: past and present ed Helen Watson White (Dunedin: Otago Settlers Association, 1999)
 Kernohan, David Wellington's old buildings (Wellington: Victoria University Press, 1994)
 Knight, Hardwicke & Wales, Niel Buildings of Dunedin: an illustrated architectural guide to New Zealand's Victorian city (Dunedin, N.Z.: John McIndoe, 1988)
 McGill, David Landmarks: notable historic buildings of New Zealand (Auckland: Godwit, 1997)
 McCarthy, C. M. Anscombe's Plans for Highrise Living "Pleasing homogeneity," "Dull times," and "animated cocktails" New Zealand Architecture in the 1930s: a one day symposium ed. Christine McCarthy, Centre for Building Performance Research, Victoria University, Wellington, New Zealand (8 December 2006) pp. 45–55.
 McCarthy, C. M. At Home with the Anscombes Contested Terrains: XXIII Annual Conference of the Society of Architectural Historians Australia and New Zealand (Fremantle, Western Australia, 29 September-2 October 2006) pp. 351–355.
 McCarthy, C. M. Cinematic celebration: Edmund Anscombe's picture theatres Celebration: XXII Annual Conference of the Society of Architectural Historians Australia and New Zealand ed Andrew Leach and Gill Matthewson (Napier 24–27 September 2005) pp. 249–254.
 McCarthy, C. M. East meets West: Edmund Anscombe's Combined Factory Building for Aotea Quay, Wellington, New Zealand The Design Journal (England) (2002) v. 5, n. 3, pp. 2–9.
 McCarthy, C. M. Traffic and the City: Town Planning interests of Edmund Anscombe Southern Crossings: Whaka whitiwhiti au Tonga Proceedings for the Sixth Australasian Urban/Planning History Conference eds. Errol Haarhoff, Diane Brand and Elizabeth Aitken-Rose Auckland, (13–16 February 2002), pp. 417–432; 
 Olssen, Erik Building the new world: work, politics and society in Caversham 1880s–1920s (Auckland: Auckland University Press, 1995)
 Shaw, Peter A history of New Zealand architecture (Auckland, N.Z. : Hodder Moa Beckett, 1997)
 "Praise Extended for Work of Late Mr. Edmund Anscombe" Dominion (12 October 1948)
 Shaw, Peter and Peter Hallett Spanish Mission Hastings: styles of five decades (Napier, N.Z.: Cosmos, 1991)

External links
 

1874 births
1948 deaths
20th-century New Zealand architects
English emigrants to New Zealand
People from Lindfield, West Sussex
Burials at Andersons Bay Cemetery
Penlington family